= Depositors Trust heist =

1980 bank burglary in Medford, Massachusetts

The Depositors Trust heist was a bank burglary at the Depositors Trust Company in Medford, Massachusetts, carried out over the Memorial Day weekend in 1980. The burglars entered through the adjacent Burns Optical and Hearing Aid Center and gained access to the bank's vault. Three police officers were accused of participating in the robbery, including former Metropolitan District Police captain Gerald Clemente, who was later convicted and sentenced to 30 to 40 years in prison.

== Background ==
The Depositors Trust Company was a bank in Medford, Massachusetts, and its premises included a vault containing customer safe-deposit boxes. The bank became the target of a major burglary during the Memorial Day weekend in 1980.

== Burglary ==
During the Memorial Day weekend of May 24–27, 1980, intruders entered the premises of Depositors Trust Company and the adjacent Burns Optical and Hearing Aid Center, which were located in the same block structure. The burglars gained entry to the bank through Burns Optical.

The burglars drilled through from the Burns Optical premises to a point above the bank's vault. They used drills and dynamite to penetrate the vault, entered it, and opened safes and safe-deposit boxes. Currency, jewelry, precious stones, and other property were taken from the bank.

The participants returned to the premises on three successive nights. After each night's burglary, they withdrew from the bank and divided the proceeds.

The value of the stolen property was disputed. Contemporary reporting estimated the total value of the cash, jewelry, and other valuables at approximately $15 million, while later reporting placed the cash loss at approximately $1.5 million, in addition to an uncertain amount of jewelry and other property.

In The Cops Are Robbers, Clemente wrote that the cash taken over the three nights was "nearly $1.2 million" and that an additional $300,000 was allegedly skimmed by Joseph Bangs and another participant; however, later reporting stated that the cash loss was approximately $1.5 million.

== Investigation and prosecution ==
The investigation continued for several years. In 1985, former Metropolitan District Police captain Gerald Clemente, former Medford Police lieutenant Thomas Doherty, Kenneth Holmes, and Francis X. O'Leary were indicted in connection with the burglary.

Contemporary reporting identified Clemente, Doherty, and former Metropolitan District Police sergeant Joseph Bangs as the three police officers accused of participating in the robbery.

The Massachusetts Appeals Court stated that Clemente proposed Depositors Trust as a target and obtained blueprints of the bank premises and vault from Doherty, then a sergeant in the Medford Police Department.

On March 18, 1986, Clemente was convicted of breaking and entering Burns Optical, breaking and entering the bank, and larceny. He received consecutive prison terms totaling 30 to 40 years.

== In media ==
Clemente later co-authored The Cops Are Robbers: A Convicted Cop's True Story of Police Corruption, published in 1987.

The story was adapted into the 1990 television film Good Cops, Bad Cops, also known as The Cops Are Robbers.
